La Historia Continúa... (Eng.: The History Continues...) is a compilation album released by Marco Antonio Solís on October 28, 2003. This album became his fourth number-one hit as a solo artist on the Billboard Top Latin Albums chart.

Track listing

All songs written and composed by Marco Antonio Solís except for En Mi Viejo San Juan

DVD

Chart performance

Sales and certifications

See also
List of number-one Billboard Top Latin Albums of 2003

References

2003 compilation albums
2003 video albums
Music video compilation albums
Marco Antonio Solís compilation albums
Marco Antonio Solís video albums
Fonovisa Records compilation albums